Ivan Kamenov Ivanov (born 25 February 1988) is a Bulgarian former professional footballer who played as a centre-back and now a manager of Slavia Sofia II and assistant to Bulgaria national team. He has been a member of the Bulgarian national team. In 2013, Ivanov was named the Bulgarian Footballer of the Year, becoming the first defender to win this award after Trifon Ivanov in 1996.

Club career

Early career
Born in Zlatitsa, Ivanov was inspired to become a footballer after watching the Bulgaria national football team's performance during their 1994 FIFA World Cup campaign. He made his debut with Pirin 1922, before moving to CSKA Sofia in 2005. With CSKA, he was a Bulgarian Cup winner in 2006 and Bulgarian Supercup winner in the same year. In August 2007, Ivanov went on loan to Lokomotiv Plovdiv. In the winter of 2008, local media reported that he was a target for English side Derby County, but problems with the work permit stopped the transfer.

CSKA Sofia

After many departures from the club in the 2008 summer transfer window, Ivanov became an integral part of CSKA's defence, together with Kiril Kotev. He was in the starting line-up against Litex Lovech in the 2008 Bulgarian Supercup, which they won 2–1. On 19 September 2008, Ivanov scored his first goal for CSKA against Minyor Pernik, a header after a corner kick in the 67th minute. On 18 March 2009, Ivanov scored against his former club Lokomotiv Plovdiv to secure a 3–1 win for CSKA. He continued his goalscoring run on 21 March 2009, in a 2–0 win against Spartak Varna. In total, Ivanov scored five league goals in the 2008–09 season.

On 15 August 2009, Ivanov scored his first goal of the 2009–10 season, in a 3–0 home win against Beroe Stara Zagora. On 27 August 2009, Ivanov scored the winning goal against Dynamo Moscow in the Europa League play-off round, helping his team to a 2–1 aggregate win and an entry into the group stage of the tournament. On 1 November 2009, he was indefinitely banned from the first team, along with eight other players, following a breach of discipline. On 20 November 2009, Ivanov was reinstated to the first team and a day later came on as a substitute for Aleksandar Branekov in a 2–2 away draw with Lokomotiv Sofia.

Alania Vladikavkaz
In February 2010, Ivanov signed a four-year contract with Alania Vladikavkaz. He scored two goals in 24 matches of the Russian Premier League. However, Alania were relegated to the Russian First Division after only one season.

Partizan
On 17 June 2011, Ivanov signed a three-year contract with Partizan. He made his competitive debut for the club on 13 July 2011, in a 4–0 home win against Shkëndija in the second qualifying round of the Champions League. On 3 December 2011, he scored his first goal for Partizan, in a 3–0 home win against Radnički Kragujevac. He also scored a header which provided to be the winning goal in their 2–1 away win over OFK Beograd on 14 March 2012. In the 2011–12 season, Ivanov played every minute of Partizan's league matches and scored four goals.

On 30 August 2012, Ivanov scored a header against Tromsø to give Partizan a 1–0 win and thus qualify the team for the Europa League group stage. In recognition of his contributions, he was voted Partizan's Player of the Year for 2012 by the club's supporters. Ivanov was also named in the 2012–13 Serbian SuperLiga Team of the Season, alongside four teammates.

Basel
In August 2013, Ivanov signed a three-year contract, with an option for an additional year, with Swiss side Basel. He joined Basel's first team for their 2013–14 season under head coach Murat Yakin. Ivanov played his domestic league debut for the club in the home game in the St. Jakob-Park on 11 August as Basel were defeated 1–2 by Zürich. He scored his first goal for the club with a header in an away cup match against local amateur club Old Boys, with an assist coming from Matías Delgado. On 11 December 2013, in the Champions League group stage away match Ivanov was shown the red card and dismissed during Basel's 0–2 feat by Schalke 04.

On 14 January 2014, Ivanov suffered a knee injury in a friendly match against Eintracht Braunschweig, causing him to miss the rest of the 2013–14 season. At the end of the season, the team won the 2013–14 Swiss Super League championship.

To the start of the 2014/15 season he was still not able to play football due to the injury reoccurring and on 16 September the club announced that Ivanov had to undergo a second suggery (anterior cruciate ligament reconstruction) but the operation had been successful.

Ivanov had expected to recover for the start of the Euro 2016 qualifiers, receiving a call-up for the match against Azerbaijan, but was eventually deemed not fully fit.

He was still convalescent at the start of the 2015/16 season. In December 2015 Ivanov's contract with Basel was terminated in mutual consent, in order to be able to cope with his injury at his own pace.

During his time with the club Ivanov played a total of 20 games for Basel scoring one goal. 11 of these games were in the Swiss Super League, one in the Swiss Cup, six in the Champions League and two were friendly games. He scored his goal in the above-mentioned cup game.

Lokomotiv Plovdiv 
After having trials at New York City FC, Ivanov was not able to sign because he was still recovering from a 2-year long injury (torn ligaments). Instead he chose to return to his home country and signed a one-and-a-half-year contract with a former team of his, PFC Lokomotiv Plovdiv. He appeared in 9 matches for Lokomotiv during the second half of the season.

Panathinaikos 
On 28 June 2016, Ivanov signed a contract with Super League Greece club Panathinaikos until the summer of 2019. He scored his first goal in a 1-1 Europa League game against Danish side Brøndby IF; a game which saw his team secure a place in the group phases of the tournament. Since joining the club, he had been a solid starter for Panathinaikos while manager Andrea Stramaccioni was in charge. However, after Marinos Ouzounidis took over, he was no longer a first-team choice for the club, especially after the defensive mistake that helped Apollon Smyrnis open the scoring in the Greek Cup match between the two (Panathinaikos eventually won 4–3); instead, discussions within Panathinaikos were made as to whether Ivanov would remain at the club even as a backup for the first team or would be completely released from his contract. He was released from Panathinaikos on 24 January 2017 by mutual consent.

Arsenal Tula 
On 1 February 2017, Ivanov joined Russian Premier League club FC Arsenal Tula on a 1.5-year contract. On 11 July 2017, Arsenal announced that Ivanov will be leaving the team.

Altay
In June 2018, Ivanov signed for two years with newly promoted to TFF First League side Altay.

Vihren Sandanski
In late June 2019, he returned to Bulgaria, signing a contract with Third League club Vihren Sandanski.

Etar
Ivanov was part of the Etar squad during the autumn of 2019.

Retirement
After struggling with injuries during the later stages of his career, on 22 May 2020 Ivanov announced his retirement from football.

International career

Youth
Ivanov represented Bulgaria at all national levels, including U-17, U-19 and U-21 teams. On 10 June 2009, he scored his only goal for the under-21 side in a 4–3 loss against Israel U-21. Ivanov also served as team captain in the absence of Nikolay Mihaylov.

Senior
Ivanov made his debut for the senior national team on 20 August 2008, in a 2–1 win against Bosnia and Herzegovina, during which he entered the match as a substitute in the 67th minute. He also came on as a substitute for the naturalized Brazilian Lúcio Wagner in a World Cup qualifier against Italy on 10 October 2008. He played the full 90 minutes in another World Cup qualifier against Georgia five days later, which also ended in a scoreless draw. On 10 October 2009, Ivanov earned his fourth cap in a 4–1 away loss against Cyprus, attracting some criticism from the media for defensive mistakes. Nonetheless, he played in the next match against Georgia.

On 6 September 2011, Ivanov netted his first national team goal, opening the scoring in a 3–1 away loss against Switzerland in a Euro 2012 qualifier. He became an integral part of the national team in the following years. After missing the qualifiers for Euro 2016 due to continued struggles with injuries, Ivanov made his return to the team on 6 September 2016, in the 4:3 win over Luxembourg in a 2018 World Cup qualification match.

Career statistics

Club

International

Scores and results list Bulgaria's goal tally first.

Honours
CSKA Sofia
 Bulgarian Cup: 2005–06
 Bulgarian Supercup: 2006, 2008

Partizan
 Serbian SuperLiga: 2011–12, 2012–13

Basel
 Swiss Super League: 2013–14, 2014–15
 Swiss Cup runner-up: 2013–14, 2014–15

Individual
 FK Partizan Player of the Year: 2012
 Serbian SuperLiga Team of the Season: 2012–13
 Bulgarian Footballer of the Year: 2013

References

External links

 
 
 

1988 births
Living people
People from Zlatitsa
Bulgarian footballers
Bulgarian expatriate footballers
Bulgaria youth international footballers
Bulgaria under-21 international footballers
Bulgaria international footballers
Association football central defenders
PFC Pirin Blagoevgrad players
PFC CSKA Sofia players
PFC Lokomotiv Plovdiv players
FC Spartak Vladikavkaz players
FK Partizan players
FC Basel players
Panathinaikos F.C. players
FC Arsenal Tula players
PFC Beroe Stara Zagora players
Altay S.K. footballers
FK Palanga players
SFC Etar Veliko Tarnovo players
FC Botev Vratsa players
First Professional Football League (Bulgaria) players
Russian Premier League players
Serbian SuperLiga players
Swiss Super League players
Super League Greece players
TFF First League players
A Lyga players
Expatriate footballers in Russia
Bulgarian expatriate sportspeople in Russia
Expatriate footballers in Serbia
Bulgarian expatriate sportspeople in Serbia
Expatriate footballers in Switzerland
Bulgarian expatriate sportspeople in Switzerland
Expatriate footballers in Greece
Bulgarian expatriate sportspeople in Greece
Expatriate footballers in Turkey
Bulgarian expatriate sportspeople in Turkey
Expatriate footballers in Lithuania
Bulgarian expatriate sportspeople in Lithuania
Sportspeople from Sofia Province